The 1929 Chico State Wildcats football team represented Chico State Teachers College—now known as California State University, Chico—as a member of the Far Western Conference (FWC) during the 1929 college football season. Led by seventh-year head coach Art Acker, Chico State compiled an overall record of 3–5 with a mark of 1–3 in conference play, tying for fourth place in the FWC. The team was outscored by its opponents 79 to 51 for the season. The Wildcats played home games at College Field in Chico, California.

Schedule

References

Chico State
Chico State Wildcats football seasons
Chico State Wildcats football